(One Way or Another) is a 1974 Cuban romantic drama film. Directed by Sara Gómez, the film mixes documentary-style footage with a fictional story that looks at the poor neighborhoods of Havana shortly after the Cuban Revolution of 1959. The film illustrates the history before the background of the development process in Cuba. It demonstrates how tearing down slums and building modern settlements does not immediately change the culture of the inhabitants. Gómez completed filming with Mario Balmaseda and Yolanda Cuellar just before her death; technical work was finished by Tomás Gutiérrez Alea, Julio García-Espinosa y Rigoberto López before its posthumous release.

It was digitally restored by Arsenal Filminstitut in 2021.

Plot
Yolanda, a female teacher, cannot find the best methods to teach the marginalized children of the slums because of their different origins. Mario, a worker in a bus factory and a typical macho man, is confronted by Yolanda's instinct for emancipation. The two nonetheless become lovers. Their relationship portrays the idea that racism, sexism, and class-based prejudices must be demolished in order to succeed.

References

External links

See also
 Social realism

1974 films
Cuban black-and-white films
1974 romantic drama films
1970s Spanish-language films
Cuban drama films